John Hanrahan was an American farmer and politician.

Born in Massachusetts, Hanrahan was a farmer and lived in the town of Granville, Wisconsin, in the community of Good Hope, Wisconsin. He served in the Wisconsin State Assembly in 1861 and 1863 as a Democrat.

Notes

Year of birth unknown
Year of death unknown
People from Massachusetts
People from Granville, Wisconsin
Democratic Party members of the Wisconsin State Assembly